Anle is a town in Ninghua County, in western Fujian province, China. , it has one residential community and 11 villages under its administration.

References

Township-level divisions of Fujian
Ninghua County